Nell Shipman (born Helen Foster-Barham; October 25, 1892 – January 23, 1970) was a Canadian actress, author, screenwriter, producer, director, animal rights activist and animal trainer. Her works often had autobiographical elements to them and reflected her passion for nature. She is best known for making a series of melodramatic adventure films based on the novels by American writer James Oliver Curwood in which she played the robust heroine known as the ‘girl from God’s country.'

Shipman started two independent producing companies in her career: Shipman-Curwood Producing Company and Nell Shipman Productions. In 1919, she and her husband, Ernest Shipman, a film producer, made the most successful silent film in Canadian history, Back to God's Country.

Personal life
She was born as Helen Foster-Barham in Victoria, British Columbia. Her parents were Arnold and Rose Barham. She grew up in a middle-class family. During her teenage years in 1904, she was based near and in Seattle, Washington, where the Foster Barham family had moved around the turn of the century.A year later, she left home and joined the Paul Gilmore traveling theatrical company. 

From an early age, she developed a respect towards animals. She was passionate about animal rights and advocated them in Hollywood. She developed her own zoo, containing more than 200 animals.

In 1904, her family moved to Seattle, Washington. A year later, she left home and joined the Paul Gilmore travelling theatrical company.

When Helen was 18 years old, she met and married Ernest Shipman, a 39-year-old theatrical impresario. Their son, Barry Shipman, was born a couple of years later in 1912.

While married to Ernie Shipman, Nell engaged in a six year long affair with actor Bert Van Tuyle. They eventually split during the filming of The Grub Stake, because of Van Tuyle's deteriorating mental state.

Two years later, in New York City, Shipman met and married a painter named Charles Ayers with whom she had two children named Charles and Daphne. They separated in 1934.

At the end of her life, Shipman moved to Cabazon, California, where she continued writing. She died there in 1970 at age 77.

Career 
From 1912 through 1917, she sold scripts to various companies, including Selig, Australasian Films, the American Film Company, the Palo Alto Film Corporation, and, most notably, Universal. She was usually involved in the film's productions as well and started acting for Universal, Seig, and Vitagraph studios. Between 1915 and 1918, she played several leading roles, including her debut in God's Country and the Woman (1915), based on a short story by American writer James Oliver Curwood. Shipman directed, produced, and acted in this film. She was one of the first directors to shoot her films almost entirely on location.

Her role in God's Country and the Woman led to an acting contract offer from Samuel Goldwyn in 1917. However, she turned down the offer and started her own independent production company with her husband Ernest. This company was responsible for Shipman's most successful film, Back to God's Country (1919), which she co-wrote and co-produced. Back to God's Country was based on the story Wapi The Walrus by James Oliver Curwood. It was one of a number of Curwood stories about adventures in the North Country with some romance thrown in. The film grossed $1.5 million on an estimated budget of $67,000. Neither she nor Ernest Shipman had been able to repeat their success with Back to God's Country. Other directors made new versions of the film, by the same title, in 1927 and 1953.

Shipman's preference for independent cinema led her to starting two producing companies, Shipman-Curwood Producing Company and Nell Shipman Productions.

Nell and Ernest Shipman eventually moved to Hollywood where the American film industry was developing. During this time, Nell Shipman sold the rights to her novel, Under the Crescent Moon to Universal Studios (they wanted to make a six-film serial of the book).

Throughout her life, Shipman wrote many scripts and short stories. One of her stories was adapted for the American film Wings in the Dark (1934), starring Myrna Loy and Cary Grant (1934). In 1925, Shipman wrote three essays called "The Movie That Couldn't Be Screened." Additionally, she wrote a children's book titled "Kurly Kew and the Tree-Princess: A Story of the Forest People Told For Other-People" (1930). Most of Nell Shipman's work had autobiographical elements to them.

Shipman's last major project was her autobiography, The Silent Screen and My Talking Heart. In the autobiography she describes her last two years at the Studio-Camp at Lion Lodge as a series of disasters. It was published posthumously by Boise State University through their Hemingway Western Studies Series. The university also houses the Nell Shipman Collection at Albertsons Library. Many of her films were preserved and are available through the library.

Shipman-Curwood Producing Company
In 1918 Shipman and her mother Rose Barahm both fell ill with influenza. Shipman managed to fully recover while her mother unfortunately passed away. It was during this time that Shipman created her first of two production companies in partnership with James Oliver Curwood.

Her husband, Ernest Shipman, convinced a consortium of Calgary businessmen to invest in Alberta, Canada. They incorporated a company, Canadian Photoplays Ltd., on February 7, 1919, with a $250,000 investment.

This company produced Back to God's Country which was based on the short story by Curwood, Wapi The Walrus. In the film a woman is blackmailed into marrying her unscrupulous suitor. Shipman adapted this for the screen herself. The 73-minute film (at 18 frames per second) was shot in Los Angeles, San Francisco and on location near Lesser Slave Lake, Alberta, Canada by director David M. Hartford. The film was titled Back to God's Country to capitalize on the success of God's Country and the Woman. Shipman played the leading role as Dolores LeBeau which featured her one of the first full frontal nude scenes. The scene was brief but considered controversial during the time. A promotional advertisement for the film had a line drawing of a nude Nell, shown from the back and frolicking with several animals. Part of the caption read: "Don't book Back To God's Country unless you want to prove the Nude is NOT Rude."

Back To God's Country was a major Canadian and international silent film hit. Despite the film's success, Curwood did not like the fact that Shipman changed the plot of his short story. She changed the protagonist of the film from Wapi the Great Dane, to Delores.

Nell Shipman Productions 
Nell Shipman Productions was created in partnership with actor Bert Van Tuyle in 1919. Shipman established herself as an independent producer during this time. She focused on the major themes she enjoyed: wild animals, nature, feminist heroes, and filming on location. She produced, wrote, co-directed and starred in The Girl From God’s Country (1921) and The Grub Stake (1923). Neither film is considered a success garnering nowhere near the amount of attention that God's Country and the Woman and Back to God's Country did.

She transported her zoo of animals on barges up to Priest Lake, Idaho, where she made several short films at Lion Head Lodge. One of the films made there was called The Grub Stake (1923). It cost around $180,000 to produce. The film was never distributed, because the American distributor went bankrupt and during the subsequent litigation, the film became tied up in the legal proceedings. Shipman and Van Tuyle edited The Grub Stake through late autumn 1922, while dodging unpaid actors and process servers, including one representing the zoo’s original owner, for missing payments. Family silver, furniture, a car, and bank accounts were taken or attached. However, Shipman and Van Tuyle managed to send a tinted and toned screening print to New York where they recut it.  

In an unfortunate series of events Van Tuyle became more and more unstable and locals started killing Shipman's animals. On top of that Shipman and Van Tuyle got lost in the wild for two days during a violent snow storm in January 1924. They encountered and were saved by two brothers, Joseph and Fred Gumaer.

In 1925, Shipman's company went bankrupt. In total, they produced ten films.

Cultural legacy
For three years, from 1917 to 1920, Nell Shipman lived in what has been preserved as The Doctor's House Museum in Glendale, California. Her mother died here in 1918 during the flu epidemic. Shipman described the site of the house in her autobiography as on a "tree lined dirt road, away from the hub bub of Hollywood".
“Nell Shipman Point” is a piece of land in Priest Lake, Idaho. It is named after her because The Grub Stake (1923) was filmed there.
The Canadian playwright Sharon Pollock was commissioned to write a one-act play about Shipman's life called Moving Pictures (1999).
All of Nell Shipman's surviving films are available on DVD from Boise State University, which holds a collection of materials about her.
Nell Shipman is considered by Canada to be the "First Lady of Canadian Cinema."
Nell Shipman was one of the first directors to shoot entirely on location.
Back to God's Country featured one of the first full frontal nude scenes.

Filmography

References

Bibliography

Further reading

 "Dreams Made in Canada – a history of feature film, 1913 to 1995" –  an article by Sam Kula, Archivist, Archives and Government Records The Archivist No. 110 (1995), Magazine of the National Archives of Canada.

External links

 Nell Shipman Website
 Canadian Film Encyclopedia [A publication of The Film Reference Library/a division of the Toronto International Film Festival Group]
Nell Shipman at the Women Film Pioneers Project
 Nell Shipman at Canadian Women Film Directors Database
 
 Nell Shipman Biography
 Canadian Encyclopedia Article on Nell Shipman
 The Nell Shipman Exhibit at City of Glendale, CA
 
 A Brief History of Nell Shipman by Joel Zemel ©1997  
 Silent Era Nell Shipman
 Nell Shipman Collection at Boise State University
 Famous Canadian Women
 Barry Shipman (Nell's son)

1892 births
1970 deaths

20th-century Canadian actresses
Actresses from Victoria, British Columbia
Canadian animal rights activists
Canadian expatriate actresses in the United States
Canadian film actresses
Film producers from British Columbia
Canadian silent film actresses
Canadian women film directors
Canadian women film producers
Canadian women screenwriters
Film producers from Washington (state)
Screenwriters from Washington (state)
Writers from Seattle
Writers from Victoria, British Columbia
20th-century Canadian screenwriters
Shipman family